Obsession is a non-fiction book written by John E. Douglas and Mark Olshaker about the psyches of serial killers, serial rapists, mass murderers, stalkers, and their victims, as well as how to fight back.

References

1998 non-fiction books
Crime books
Books about violence
Works about stalking
Collaborative non-fiction books
Charles Scribner's Sons books
Books about rape